Azadkənd or Azadkend may refer to:
Azadkənd, Nakhchivan, Azerbaijan
Azadkənd, Saatly, Azerbaijan
Azadkənd, Sabirabad, Azerbaijan